Ox-Head and Horse-Face are two guardians or types of guardians of the underworld in Chinese mythology. As indicated by their names, both have the bodies of men, but Ox-Head has the head of an ox while Horse-Face has the face of a horse. They are the first beings a dead soul encounters upon entering the underworld; in many stories they directly escort the newly dead to the underworld.

Role

In their duties as guardians of Diyu, the realm of the dead, their role is to capture human souls who have reached the end of their earthly existence and bring them before the courts of Hell. Souls are then rewarded or punished based on the actions performed in their lifetime.

Ox-Head and Horse-Face also play the role of messengers of the king of hell, Yanluo Wang (閻羅王). Ox-Head has also been "created" by the latter took pity by the arrival of a newly dead ox, who had worked hard all his life: he made him one of his faithful servants.

Chinese mythology 
In the Chinese classical novel Journey to the West, Ox-Head and Horse-Face are among the underworld denizens overpowered by Sun Wukong after his soul is dragged to hell in his sleep. He then crosses out his name and those of all non-human primates on earth from the record of living souls, hence granting a second level of immortality to himself and general immortality to his monkey children.

Japanese mythology 
In Japanese mythology, Ox-Head and Horse-Face are known as "Gozu" and "Mezu" respectively. They appear in classical Japanese literature such as the Konjaku Monogatarishū and Taiheiki. In The Tale of the Heike, they appear in an ominous dream of Taira no Tokiko.

Vietnamese mythology 
In Vietnamese mythology, the Ox-Head and Horse-Face are called Đầu Trâu and Mặt Ngựa or Ngưu Đầu''' and Mã Diện''. They are also responsible for leading people's souls to the underworld after death.

Gallery

See also
 Castor and Pollux
 Alexiares and Anicetus, twin-sons of Heracles/Hercules and Hebe/Juventas; alongside their father, they are the guardians of the gates of Mount Olympus.  
 Chinese folk religion
 Chenghuangshen(城隍公)
 Heibai Wuchang (黑白無常)
 Janus
 List of supernatural beings in Chinese folklore
 Lugal-irra and Meslamta-ea
 Meng Po (孟婆)
 Nio
 Youdu (幽都)
 Zhong Kui (鍾馗)

References

Chinese legendary creatures
Horses in Chinese mythology
Literary duos
Ox-Head
Horse-Face
Psychopomps